Wheatstone Glacier is a glacier on the west coast of Graham Land. It enters Errera Channel east of Danco Island. Charted by the Belgian Antarctic Expedition under Gerlache, 1897–99. Named by the United Kingdom Antarctic Place-Names Committee (UK-APC) in 1960 for Sir Charles Wheatstone (1802–75), English scientist and inventor who designed the first mirror stereoscope in 1832.

Glaciers of Danco Coast